The 1977 Gator Bowl was a college football bowl game played between the Pittsburgh Panthers and Clemson Tigers on December 30, 1977. The 10th-ranked Panthers defeated the 11th-ranked Tigers, 34–3. Panthers quarterback Matt Cavanaugh broke the Gator Bowl record for passing yards with 387 yards, breaking the previous record of 362 yards set by Florida State's Kim Hammond in 1967.

References

Gator Bowl
Gator Bowl
Pittsburgh Panthers football bowl games
Clemson Tigers football bowl games
Gator Bowl
20th century in Jacksonville, Florida
December 1977 sports events in the United States